John Dunne (born June 11, 1970) is an American college basketball coach and current head men's basketball coach at Marist College.

He was previously an assistant coach at Adelphi University under Steve Clifford and at Seton Hall University under Louis Orr. He also served as an assistant coach at Siena College.

Dunne was born in Queens, New York and attended Archbishop Molloy High School, where he also played basketball. He played at the collegiate level at Ithaca College.

Dunne was hired by Saint Peter's University as their men's basketball coach in 2006. While at Saint Peter's, he became the first coach in MAAC history to bring a No. 9 seed to the semifinals of the MAAC tournament, when Saint Peter's University beat No. 1 seeded Rider University 66–55 on March 2, 2018.

On April 3, 2018, Dunne was hired as the new coach for Marist College.

Head coaching record

References

External links
 Marist profile
 Saint Peter's profile

1970 births
Living people
Adelphi Panthers men's basketball coaches
American men's basketball players
American men's basketball coaches
Archbishop Molloy High School alumni
Basketball coaches from New York (state)
Basketball players from New York City
College men's basketball head coaches in the United States
Ithaca Bombers men's basketball players
Manhattan Jaspers basketball coaches
Marist Red Foxes men's basketball coaches
Saint Peter's Peacocks men's basketball coaches
Seton Hall Pirates men's basketball coaches
Siena Saints men's basketball coaches
Sportspeople from Queens, New York
Western Michigan Broncos men's basketball coaches
Wilkes Colonels men's basketball coaches